Boletus separans is a species of bolete fungus in the family Boletaceae. It was described as new to science in 1873 by American mycologist Charles Horton Peck. In 1998, Roy Halling and Ernst Both transferred the bolete to the genus Xanthoconium. Molecular phylogenetic analysis published in 2013 shows that it is more closely related to Boletus sensu stricto than to Xanthoconium.

The species is a choice edible mushroom.

See also
List of Boletus species
List of North American boletes

References

External links

separans
Edible fungi
Fungi described in 1873
Fungi of North America
Taxa named by Charles Horton Peck